Kisač (Slovak: Kysáč) is a suburban settlement of the city of Novi Sad, Serbia. The settlement has a Slovak ethnic majority.

Name
In Serbian and Croatian the village is known as Kisač (Кисач); in Slovak as Kysáč; in Czech as Kysáč; and in Hungarian as Kiszács.

History

The village was firstly mentioned in 1457. In this time it was under administration of the medieval Kingdom of Hungary and was part of the Bács (Bač) county. In the 16th-17th century, it was under administration of the Ottoman Empire and was part of the Sanjak of Segedin, firstly within the Budin Eyalet and later within the Egir Eyalet. During this time it was populated by ethnic Serbs.

In the end of the 17th century, the region of Bačka was captured by the Habsburg monarchy and in the beginning of the 18th century population of Kisač numbered 110 Serb houses. The Serbs, however, emigrated to Syrmia and the village became abandoned. It was later rebuilt and populated by the Slovak settlers from the Pest County and Central Slovakia. First settlers arrived in 1773, while most of them arrived between 1776 and 1786. In 1798, population of Kisač numbered 337 Slovak families.

Until the middle of the 19th century, the village was part of the Batsch-Bodrog County within the Habsburg Kingdom of Hungary. In 1848-1849 it was part of the autonomous Serbian Vojvodina and from 1849 to 1860 it was part of the Voivodeship of Serbia and Banat of Temeschwar, a separate Habsburg crownland. After abolishment of the voivodeship in 1860, the village was again included into Batsch-Bodrog County. According to 1910 census, most of the inhabitants of the village spoke Slovak.

Since 1918, the village was part of the Kingdom of Serbs, Croats and Slovenes (later renamed to Yugoslavia). In 1918-1919, it was part of the Banat, Bačka and Baranja region, and also (from 1918 to 1922) part of the Novi Sad County. From 1922 to 1929, it was part of the Bačka Oblast, and from 1929 to 1941 part of the Danube Banovina. After World War I, new settlement named Tankosićevo was built near Kisač. This new settlement was populated by 24 Serb colonist families.

From 1941 to 1944, Kisač and Tankosićevo were under Axis occupation and were attached to the Horthy's Hungary. In 1944, the Soviet Red Army and Yugoslav partisans expelled Axis troops from the region and two villages were included into autonomous province of Vojvodina within new socialist Yugoslavia. Since 1945, Vojvodina is part of the People's Republic of Serbia within Yugoslavia. After the war, Slovak ethnic majority was recorded in both settlements. During the 1970s, the two villages, Kisač and Tankosićevo, were joined into a single settlement named Kisač.

Demographics

Ethnic groups

1971:

According to the 1971 census, ethnic Slovaks comprised 90.60% of population of the village.

2002:

In 2002, population of Kisač numbered 5,471 people, including:
 Slovaks = 4,505
 Serbs = 650
 Yugoslavs = 106
 others

Demographics

Culture

There is a Slovak Evangelist Church (from 1795) and a Serbian Orthodox Church (from 1773) in the settlement.
The Kisač Culture and Information Centre (KYS), founded in 1964, promotes cultural activities, mainly folklore and amateur theatre. Radio Kisač, a part of KYS, was the first local radio station to be founded in Vojvodina.

Geography

Traffic
It is connected to Novi Sad by bus lines 42 and 43.

Notable people
 Milan Stepanov, footballer
 Ján Podhradský, footballer
 Jozef Roháček, Bible translator
 Ivan Vladimir Rohaček, chess player

Sister cities
Kisač has friendship with:
  Kysak, Slovakia
  Belá-Dulice, Slovakia
  Hontianske Nemce, Slovakia

See also
 Tankosićevo
 Novi Sad
 List of places in Serbia
 List of cities, towns and villages in Vojvodina

References

 Slobodan Ćurčić, Broj stanovnika Vojvodine, Novi Sad, 1996.
 Slobodan Ćurčić, Naselja Bačke - geografske karakteristike, Novi Sad, 2007.
 Enciklopedija Novog Sada, sveska 11, Novi Sad, 1998.

External links

 Facebook of Kysáč

Suburbs of Novi Sad
South Bačka District
Slovak communities in Serbia